The King's Dragon is the 41st Doctor Who New Series Adventures novel published on 8 July 2010 by BBC Books and written by Una McCormack. It features the Eleventh Doctor with Amy Pond and Rory Williams as his companions.

Synopsis
The Doctor, Amy and Rory arrive in the city-state of Geath, where it appears that everyone is happy and rich. However, they discover that there are secrets and creatures hidden, as well as a metal dragon that oozes gold. A Herald appears demanding the return of her treasure and a battle for possession of the treasure begins. The Doctor, Amy and Rory must save the people of the city before they are destroyed by the war.

Reception
Jonathan Wilkins of Total Sci-Fi Online gave the book 8 out of 10, calling it a "fun fantasy-tinged tale" and "groundbreaking" for Doctor Who as it included more fantasy. Unreality SF gave it 80%, disappointed with the low-page count but saying McCormack "was perfectly able to tell an engaging, enjoyable tale in the space she got", even though some parts seemed "cut short". He thought that she "captured the spirit" of Doctor Who well and the characterisations of the three main characters was realistic.  Doctor Who Magazine described the novel as 'drawn in deliciously exquisite detail [...] the unique environment lends a vibrancy and elegance to every scene. The plot is thoroughly absorbing, but it's almost secondary to the beautiful way in which the whole thing is told.'

References

External links

2010 British novels
2010 science fiction novels
New Series Adventures
Eleventh Doctor novels
Novels set on fictional planets